Hartstown Community School is an Irish Secondary School located in Hartstown, Clonsilla. It serves the area of Hartstown, Huntstown and other localities in the Clonsilla suburb.

Hartstown / Huntstown Community School is a co-educational, multi-denominational Community School founded in 1992 to cater for the educational needs of Hartstown & Huntstown 2nd level pupils. There is also an Adult Education Programme which caters for the wider community of Hartstown and the surrounding areas.

References

External links 
 Official Hartstown Community School Website

Secondary schools in Fingal